A cabbage tree hat (also known as a cabbage palm hat) is a hat made from the leaves of the Livistona australis, also known as the cabbage-tree palm. It is known as the first distinctively Australian headwear in use. Seeking protection from the sun, early European settlers started to make hats using fibre from the native palm, which soon became popular throughout the colonies. The process involved boiling, then drying, and finally bleaching the leaves. The Powerhouse Museum describes a cabbage-tree hat thus: "Finely woven natural straw coloured hat; high tapering domed crown, wide flat brim; applied layered hat band of coarser plaiting with zig-zag border edges."

Cabbage tree mob
During the convict era, gangs of insolent youths were known as cabbage tree mobs because they wore the hat. One of their favourite pastimes was to crush the hats of men deemed too "full of themselves". Cabbage tree mobs are recognised as a predecessor of the larrikin.

Mentions of the hat
There are many mentions of the hat in Australian documents.

 In Volume 2 of Collins, David: An Account of the English Colony in New South Wales from its first settlement, in January 1788, to August 1801, London 1802, Chapter XIX Flinders voyage to Moreton Bay in 1799.
 In Volume 6 of the Historical Records of Victoria, published after the address by Police Historian Gary Presland at the Annual General Meeting in March 2005, it states: 
 In Edward Micklethwaite Curr's Recollections of Squatting in Victoria, it says: 
 In Margaret Maynard's Fashioned from Penury, it states: 
 On page 53 of Men of Yesterday, Margaret Kiddle refers to the cabbage tree hat as "ubiquitous" in the 1840s.

References

External links
 
, historical hat maker in Canberra, Australia, makes & teaches Cabbage Tree Hat Workshops.

Australian fashion
19th-century fashion
Hats
Australian headgear